Terminus Terrebonne is a bus terminus served by Réseau de transport métropolitain (RTM).

Bus routes

See also 
 ARTM park and ride lots

References

External links
Terminus Metropolitains - Terrebonne

Exo bus stations
Transport in Terrebonne, Quebec
Buildings and structures in Lanaudière